Matt Gerald (born May 2, 1970) is an American actor and screenwriter.
Gerald was born in Miami, Florida. A graduate of The University of Pennsylvania, he is best known for his Marvel Cinematic Universe (MCU) roles as White Power Dave in All Hail the King (2014) and Melvin Potter in Netflix's Daredevil (2015–2018) and as Corporal Lyle Wainfleet in James Cameron's science-fiction Avatar franchise.

Filmography

Film

Television

References

External links
 

American male film actors
American male television actors
Male actors from Miami
University of Pennsylvania alumni
Living people
20th-century American male actors
21st-century American male actors
1970 births